Marlieux—Châtillon station (French: Gare de Marlieux—Châtillon) is a French railway station located in the commune of Marlieux, Ain department in the Auvergne-Rhône-Alpes region. As its name suggests the station is located within proximity of, and serves the nearby commune of Châtillon-sur-Chalaronne. It is located at kilometric point (KP) 45.760 on the Lyon–Bourg-en-Bresse railway, between the stations of Villars-les-Dombes and Saint-Paul-de-Varax.

The station was put into service in 1866 by the Compagnie de la Dombes.

As of 2020, the station is owned and operated by the SNCF and served by TER Auvergne-Rhône-Alpes trains.

History 

The "station de Marlieux" was put into service by the Compagnie de la Dombes, on 1 September 1866, along with the opening of railway between Sathonay and Bourg-en-Bresse.

For summer service, beginning 10 May 1869, the station was served by four daily (in each direction) "omnibus mixtes" (passengers and freight) services between Bourg-en-Bresse/Besançon/Mulhouse/Strasbourg and Lyon-Croix-Rousse. On the Bourg-en-Bresse and Lyon-Croix-Rousse service, an addition train was added on Mondays and Wednesdays.

In 1872, the station became part of the Compagnie des Dombes et des chemins de fer du Sud-Est's (DSE) network which substituted its original operator.

In 2019, the SNCF estimated that 119,224 passengers traveled through the station.

Historic Marlieux-Châtillon station 
In 1897, a second station was installed next to the existing station. An exchange station, it was the origin of a secondary metric railway which linked Marlieux and Châtillon-sur-Chalaronne. The department line, with a length of 11.375 km, was operated by the Compagnie du chemin de fer de Marlieux à Châtillon (MC) until 1919 when it was taken over by the Tramways de l'Ain (TA). Trains circulated along the route until 1934.

Railway heritage 
Once removed from service, the historic passenger building was renovated to become the mairie of the commune. It is identical to numerous other passenger buildings constructed along the line by the Compagnie de la Dombes.

Services

Passenger services 
Classified as a PANG (point d'accès non géré), the station is unstaffed and equipped with automatic ticket dispensers.

Train services 
As of 2020, the station is served by the following services:

 Regional services (TER Auvergne-Rhône-Alpes 32) Bourg-en-Bresse ... Lyon.

Intermodality 
In addition to a parking lot for passengers, the station is equipped with secure bicycle storage facilities.

See also 

 List of SNCF stations in Auvergne-Rhône-Alpes

References 

Railway stations in Ain
Railway stations in France opened in 1866